Ranjeet Singh Verma (4 October 1934 – 2 September 2019) was an Indian politician. He was a two term Member of the Uttar Pradesh Legislative Assembly. Singh represented Mussoorie assembly constituency.

References

1934 births
Uttar Pradesh MLAs 1977–1980
Uttar Pradesh MLAs 1989–1991
2019 deaths